Robinsons or Robinson's may refer to:

Businesses

Department stores
 Robinsons Malls, shopping mall and retail operator in the Philippines
 Robinsons, former department store chain owned by Robinson & Co. in Singapore and Malaysia
 Robinson Department Store, department store based in Thailand
 J. W. Robinson's, a chain of department stores that operated in Southern California and Arizona
Robinsons-May, a Southwest U.S. chain of department stores formed from J. W. Robinson's
 Robinson's of Florida, a department store chain

Other businesses
 Robinsons Department Stores Online, online retail company based in Singapore
 Robinsons (drink), a British soft drink brand
 Robinson's Brewery, the British regional brewery Frederic Robinson Ltd

Other uses
 Robinsons, Newfoundland and Labrador, Canada
 Robinson's, California, former settlement in Calaveras County later known as Melones
 The Robinsons, a British TV series

See also
 Robinson (disambiguation)
 Robison (disambiguation)